The Beat of London is a variety program aired on Fox8 on 30 July 2012 until 10 August 2012, hosted by Darren McMullen, Laura Whitmore and Dave Berry.

Overview

The programme features world  celebrities, sports personalities, comedians and live music gigs including Grammy Award-fame singers like Mark Ronson, Katy B, Dizzee Rascal, and many more.

"I'm extremely excited to be in London for the Games hosting a show that will be focused on a youth audience," was the remark made by McMullen about the program. Dave Berry from London's Capital FM took the responsibility of running a 'pop-up' live studio in a road-bus to the Olympic venues capturing the events targeted for the teenagers of the world. The Beat of London was a joint venture between ITV and Coca-Cola covering more than 30 countries.

References

Fox8 original programming
Australian variety television shows
Olympics on Australian television
2012 Summer Olympics
2012 Australian television series debuts
2012 Australian television series endings
2012 British television series debuts
2012 British television series endings
Television shows set in London